Mary Stella Rosenberg Cota-Robles (1915–1989) was Arizona’s first Hispanic American female lawyer.

She was born in Tubac, Arizona in 1915. In 1940, Cota-Robles became the first Hispanic female admitted to practice law in Arizona. Cota-Robles worked as a Deputy County Attorney during the 1950s and a defense attorney during the 1960s. She was married to Mario Cota-Robles, Esq. and they eventually opened a law office in Tucson, Arizona. She died in 1989 in Tucson, Arizona.

See also 

 List of first women lawyers and judges in Arizona

References 

Arizona lawyers
People from Santa Cruz County, Arizona
1915 births
1989 deaths
20th-century American women lawyers
20th-century American lawyers